Lamprosema distincta is a moth in the family Crambidae. It was described by William James Kaye in 1901. It is found in Trinidad.

References

Moths described in 1901
Lamprosema
Moths of the Caribbean